Norberto Raffo (27 April 1939 – 16 December 2008) was an Argentine football striker. He was born in the city of Avellaneda in the Buenos Aires Province of Argentina. He was the Copa Libertadores de América Topscorer in Copa Libertadores 1967 with 14 goals for eventual champions Racing Club, the second highest total ever achieved in a single Copa Libertadores season.

Playing career
Raffo played for both of the Avellaneda giants Independiente and Racing Club winning major titles with both teams.

He is best remembered by the fans of Banfield for scoring 68 goals in 180 games for the club between 1960 and 1966, making him the 3rd top scorer in the club's history.

Raffo also played for  Atlanta, Lanús, Altos Hornos Zapla in Argentina, Huachipato in Chile and América de Cali in Colombia.

Titles

Managerial career

Raffo went on to manage several Argentine clubs, most notably Lanús on several occasions and Banfield. His other clubs included Argentino de Quilmes, El Porvenir, Gimnasia y Esgrima de Jujuy, Altos Hornos Zapla and Talleres (RE).

Raffo also had a long spell in charge of the Lanús youth team, between 1987 and 1996.

References

External links
Soy de Banfield profile 

1939 births
2008 deaths
Sportspeople from Avellaneda
Argentine footballers
Argentina international footballers
Association football forwards
Club Atlético Independiente footballers
Club Atlético Banfield footballers
Racing Club de Avellaneda footballers
Club Atlético Atlanta footballers
América de Cali footballers
Club Atlético Lanús footballers
C.D. Huachipato footballers
Argentine Primera División players
Argentine expatriate footballers
Expatriate footballers in Chile
Argentine football managers
Club Atlético Lanús managers
Club Atlético Banfield managers
Gimnasia y Esgrima de Jujuy managers
Talleres de Remedios de Escalada managers